Luca Berardocco (born 22 January 1991) is an Italian footballer who plays as a midfielder for  club Juve Stabia.

Career

Pescara
Born in Pescara, Berardocco started his career at the hometown club.  Berardocco made his Serie B debut in January 2011, the first season Pescara back first division from the third. Berardocco wore no.55 that season.

In July 2011, Pescara farmed Berardocco to Pisa. Pescara gifted half of the registration rights to Pisa for €500.

On 30 January 2012 Berardocco left for Viareggio in temporary deal. rejoining former Pescara teammate Bruno Martella.

He received a call-up to Italy Lega Pro representative team against Palestine Olympic (U23) team. However, he did not play. In June 2012 Berardocco returned to Pescara also for €500. Berardocco did not play any game in 2012–13 Serie A. On 30 January 2013 Berardocco was signed by FeralpiSalò.

In June 2013 it was reported that he requested to terminate the contract, which made official on 2 July.

Parma
On 22 July 2013 Berardocco was signed by Parma F.C. on a free transfer; on 1 August he joined Slovenian club Nova Gorica in temporary deal along with Checcucci, Favalli, Gigli, Misuraca, Vanin and Vicente. The club had signed 9 players from Parma on 1 July. Berardocco made his debut on 2 August.

On 17 July 2014 he was signed by Serie B club Crotone on loan. On 30 January 2015 he was signed by Calcio Como.

Serie C clubs
In summer 2015 he was signed by Carrarese. On 9 July 2016 Berardocco was signed by Sambenedettese in a 1-year contract. On 5 January 2017 he was sold to fellow Lega Pro club Padova in a -year contract.

On 1 September 2020 he joined Juve Stabia.

On 14 January 2022, he returned to Carrarese.

On 10 August 2022, Berardocco rejoined Juve Stabia on a two-year contract.

References

External links
PrvaLiga profile 

AIC.Football.it Profile 

1991 births
Living people
People from Pescara
Italian footballers
Association football midfielders
Delfino Pescara 1936 players
Pisa S.C. players
F.C. Esperia Viareggio players
Slovenian PrvaLiga players
Parma Calcio 1913 players
Italian expatriate footballers
Expatriate footballers in Slovenia
Italian expatriate sportspeople in Slovenia
ND Gorica players
F.C. Crotone players
Como 1907 players
Carrarese Calcio players
F.C. Südtirol players
S.S. Juve Stabia players
Serie B players
Serie C players